Ronnie L. McCartney (born July 20, 1954) is a former American football linebacker.  After playing college football as a defensive end at the University of Tennessee, he was drafted by the Los Angeles Rams with the 53rd pick of the 2nd round of the 1976 NFL Draft.  He spent the entire 1976 season with the Rams on the injured reserve list.  After the Rams waived him before the 1977 season, he was picked up by the Falcons.  He spent three seasons as a linebacker for the Falcons, playing in 45 games from 1977 through 1979.  He recovered four fumbles during his career.  The Falcons cut him before the 1980 season.

McCartney was named the outstanding defensive player of the 1974 Liberty Bowl with the University of Tennessee Volunteers.

References

1954 births
Living people
American football linebackers
Los Angeles Rams players
Atlanta Falcons players
Tennessee Volunteers football players
Sportspeople from Charleston, West Virginia
Players of American football from West Virginia
American football defensive ends